Urera expansa is a species of plant in the family Urticaceae. It is endemic to Jamaica.

References

expansa
Endemic flora of Jamaica
Taxonomy articles created by Polbot